Grammitis basalis is a species of fern in the family Polypodiaceae. It is endemic to Ecuador.  Its natural habitat is subtropical or tropical moist lowland forests. It is threatened by habitat loss.

References

basalis
Ferns of Ecuador
Endemic flora of Ecuador
Ferns of the Americas
Endangered flora of South America
Taxonomy articles created by Polbot